Rockers Meets King Tubbys in a Firehouse, is a dub studio album by Augustus Pablo and King Tubby, released in 1980. It features Mickey "Boo" Richards, Leroy Wallace and Albert Malawi on drums, Robbie Shakespeare on bass guitar, and Earl "Chinna" Smith on guitar.  The backing band is credited as the Rocking All Stars. Pablo produced the album and played piano, organ and melodica.  The album was recorded at King Tubby's Studio. "Fire House" is a reference to the Waterhouse section of Kingston, where King Tubby's studio was located.  Prince Jammy also made contributions to this album but goes uncredited.

The album has been released on several different labels, often with slightly different track lists.

Track listing 
Side one
 "Rockers Meet King Tubbys in a Firehouse" – 4:02
 "Short Man Dub" – 3:17
 "Zion Is a Home" – 4:35
 "Dub in a Matthews Lane Arena" – 3:32

Side two
 "Jah Says Dub" – 3:53
 "Son of Jah Dub" – 3:38
 "Simeon Tradition" – 3:20
 "Selassie I Dub" – 3:49
 "Jah Moulty Ital Sip" – 2:48

2003 CD reissue bonus tracks
 "Son of Man Dub" – 4:02 
 "Rasta to the Hills" – 4:04 
 "Twin Seal Dub" – 2:35 
 "House of Dub Version" – 4:23

Personnel 
Augustus Pablo – Melodica, piano, clavinet, organ, producer
Robbie Shakespeare – Bass
Junior Dan – Bass
Michael Taylor – Bass
Bugsy – Bass
Mikey "Boo" Richards – Drums
Albert Malawi – Drums
Leroy "Horsemouth" Wallace – Drums
Earl "Chinna" Smith – Guitar
Dalton Brownie – Guitar
Fazal Prendergast – Guitar
Cleon – Guitar
"Deadley" Headley Bennett – Trumpet
Jah Levi - Percussion
Jah Teo Benjamin - Percussion
Uziah "Sticky" Thompson - Percussion

External links 

Roots Archives

Augustus Pablo albums
1980 albums
Dub albums